Bradyrhizobium lablabi is a Gram-negative, aerobic, non-spore-forming bacteria from the genus of Bradyrhizobium. which was isolated from Lablab purpureus in the Anhui province in China.

References

Nitrobacteraceae
Bacteria described in 2011